Olivera Moldovan (born 1 March 1989) is a Serbian sprint canoer.

Career
Olivera was born on 1 March 1989 in Belgrade, SR Serbia, Yugoslavia to a Serb father, Zoran Moldovan and a Russian mother, Tatjana, originally from Sochi, Russian SFSR, Soviet Union.

Her sister Nikolina Moldovan is also a sprint canoer.

Olivera represented Serbia with her sister at the 2012 Summer Olympics in the K-2 500m discipline.

References

External links
 
 
 
 Biography at sportline.hu

1989 births
Living people
Serbian female canoeists
Serbian people of Russian descent
Olympic canoeists of Serbia
Canoeists at the 2012 Summer Olympics
Canoeists at the 2016 Summer Olympics
Sportspeople from Belgrade
ICF Canoe Sprint World Championships medalists in kayak
European Games medalists in canoeing
Canoeists at the 2015 European Games
European Games silver medalists for Serbia
Universiade medalists in canoeing
Universiade silver medalists for Serbia
Universiade bronze medalists for Serbia
Medalists at the 2013 Summer Universiade
21st-century Serbian women